Condeissiat is a commune in the Ain department in eastern France.

Population

See also
Communes of the Ain department
Dombes

References

External links

La Dombes and the city of Condeissiat

Communes of Ain
Ain communes articles needing translation from French Wikipedia
Dombes